Gossau can mean either of two municipalities of Switzerland:

 Gossau, St. Gallen, a city of 17,000 inhabitants
 Gossau, Zürich, a town of 9,000 inhabitants

Gossauer may refer to:

 the inhabitants of either of the municipalities above
 Alwina Gossauer (1841–1926), a Swiss women professional photographer and businesswoman from Rapperswil